John James Wallace (September 2, 1904 – July 3, 1981) was an American football player. He played college football at Notre Dame and professional football in the National Football League (NFL) as an end for the Chicago Bears in 1928 and the Dayton Triangles in 1929. He appeared in 16 NFL games, five as a starter.

References

1904 births
1981 deaths
Notre Dame Fighting Irish football players
Chicago Bears players
Dayton Triangles players
Players of American football from Illinois